Garin d'Apchier was an Auvergnat castellan and troubadour from Apcher in the Diocese of Mende in the Gévaudan. His life cannot be dated with precision. According to his vida he was "a valiant and good warrior ... and a handsome knight. And he knew all there was to know about love and gallantry."

Garin left behind three sirventes. According to his vida, he invented the descort genre of lyric poetry when he wrote the piece that begins Quan foill'e flors reverdezis / et aug lo chan del rossignol ("When the leaf and the flower bud / and I hear the song of the nightingale"), but this has now been lost. He wrote a short literary cycle of sirventes with Torcafol.

Notes

Sources
Egan, Margarita, ed. The Vidas of the Troubadours. New York: Garland, 1984. .
Latella, Fortunata. Premessa all’edizione in linea dei sirventesi di Garin d’Apchier e Torcafol. 2002.

External links
Complete works at Rialto.

12th-century French troubadours
Year of death unknown
Year of birth unknown
People from Mende, Lozère